Charbonnier-les-Mines is a commune in the Puy-de-Dôme department in Auvergne-Rhône-Alpes in central France. It is in the canton of Brassac-les-Mines.

See also
Communes of the Puy-de-Dôme department

References

Charbonnierlesmines